Buddy Ebsen (born Christian Ludolf Ebsen Jr., April 2, 1908 – July 6, 2003), also known as Frank "Buddy" Ebsen, was an American actor and dancer, whose career spanned seven decades. One of his most famous roles was as Jed Clampett in the CBS television sitcom The Beverly Hillbillies (1962–1971); afterwards he starred as the title character in the television detective drama Barnaby Jones (1973–1980).

Originally a dancer, Ebsen began his film career in Broadway Melody of 1936. He also appeared as a dancer with child star Shirley Temple in Captain January (1936). He was cast to appear in The Wizard of Oz (1939), originally as the Scarecrow, and before filming began, his role was changed to the Tin Man. He fell seriously ill during filming due to the aluminum dust in his makeup and was forced to drop out. He appeared with Maureen O'Hara in They Met in Argentina (1941) and June Havoc in Sing Your Worries Away (1942).  In Breakfast at Tiffany's (1961), he portrayed Doc Golightly, the much older husband of Audrey Hepburn's character. Before his starring role in The Beverly Hillbillies, Ebsen had a successful television career, the highlight of which was his role as Davy Crockett's sidekick, George Russell, in Walt Disney's Davy Crockett miniseries (1953–54).

Early years
A middle child with four sisters, Buddy Ebsen was born as Christian Ludolf Ebsen Jr., on April 2, 1908, in Belleville, Illinois. His father, Christian Ludolf Ebsen Sr., was born in Niebüll, Germany in 1872 and moved to the United States in 1888. He worked as a choreographer and was a physical fitness advocate; he owned a dance studio and subsequently operated a natatorium for the local school district. His mother, Frances (née Wendt), was a Baltic German (specifically, Latvian) painter. 

Ebsen was raised in Belleville until the age of ten when his family moved to Palm Beach County, Florida. In 1920, Ebsen and his family relocated to Orlando, Florida. Ebsen and his sisters learned to dance at a dance studio his father operated in Orlando. 

During his high school years, Ebsen became a member of John M. Cheney Chapter, Order of DeMolay. His involvement as a teenager led to his being recognized by DeMolay in adult life with the award of the Legion of Honor Degree, and later by induction into the DeMolay Alumni Hall of Fame. 

Ebsen graduated from Orlando High School in 1926. Initially interested in a medical career, Ebsen attended the University of Florida in Gainesville, Florida, from 1926 to 1927, and then Rollins College in Winter Park, Florida, from 1927 to 1928. Family financial problems caused by the collapse of the Florida land boom forced Ebsen to leave college at age 20.

Career
 
Ebsen left Orlando in the summer of 1928 to try his luck as a dancer in New York City, arriving with only $26.75 in his pocket, and worked at a soda fountain shop. His sister Vilma Ebsen and he performed as a dance act in supper clubs and in vaudeville — they were known as "The Baby Astaires". On Broadway, the Ebsens appeared in the musicals Whoopee, Flying Colors, and Ziegfeld Follies of 1934. A rave review from New York columnist Walter Winchell, who saw them perform in Atlantic City, New Jersey, led to a booking at the Palace Theatre in New York City, the pinnacle of the vaudeville world.

MGM signing

Ebsen went on to appear in numerous films, both musicals and nonmusicals, including the 1936 Born to Dance, the 1936 Captain January (in which he danced with Shirley Temple),  the 1938 Broadway Melody of 1938 (with Judy Garland as his dance partner), and the 1938 The Girl of the Golden West. Ebsen partnered with actresses Eleanor Powell and Frances Langford, among others, and also danced solo.

Ebsen was noted for his unusual, surreal dancing and singing style (for example, his contribution to the "Swingin' the Jinx Away" finale of Born to Dance). His abilities might have been a reason filmmaker Walt Disney chose Ebsen to be filmed dancing in front of a grid as an aid to animating Mickey Mouse's dancing in Disney's 1929 to 1939 Silly Symphonies animated short films.

The Wizard of Oz

Ebsen turned down Louis B. Mayer's offer of an exclusive MGM contract, and Mayer warned him that he would never work in Hollywood again. Nonetheless, MGM cast him as the Scarecrow in its 1939 film The Wizard of Oz. Ebsen then swapped roles with actor Ray Bolger, who was originally cast as the Tin Man. Bolger wanted to play the Scarecrow, and Ebsen did not object to the change. Ebsen had recorded all of his songs as the Tin Man, attended all the rehearsals, and begun filming. However, he soon began experiencing body aches, muscle cramps, and shortness of breath, eventually leading to a lengthy  hospitalization. Doctors determined that he was suffering a severe allergic reaction to the aluminum dust used in the Tin Man makeup, and he was forced to leave the production. Ebsen recalled in an interview included on the 2005 DVD release of The Wizard of Oz that the MGM  studio heads did not believe that he was ill until he was ordered back to the set and was intercepted by an angry nurse.

Ebsen was replaced by Jack Haley, with the makeup quickly changed to a safer aluminum paste. MGM did not publicize the true reason for Ebsen's departure; even Haley was not told until much later. Haley re-recorded most of Ebsen's vocals, although Ebsen's Midwestern accent can still be heard on the soundtrack during several reprises of "We're Off to See the Wizard", with the enunciated "r" in the word "wizard", as opposed to Haley's Boston accent. Ebsen's recording of the Tin Man's solo "If I Only Had a Heart" is included on the deluxe edition of the film's soundtrack, while a still photo recreation of the sequence featuring shots of Ebsen as the Tin Man was included as an extra with all VHS and DVD releases of the film since 1989. For the rest of his life, Ebsen complained of breathing problems from his involvement in "that damned movie". Nonetheless, he outlived all the major cast members in the film, with only some Munchkin actors and extras such as Shep Houghton outliving him.

World War II
After recovering from the illness, Ebsen became embroiled in a contract dispute with MGM that left him idle for long periods. He took up sailing and became so proficient in seamanship that he taught the subject to naval officer candidates. He applied several times for a commission in the Navy in 1941, but was repeatedly turned down. The United States Coast Guard accepted his application for a commission, and he was promptly given the rank of lieutenant, junior grade. This wartime rank was one step up from the rank of ensign, the usual rank given newly appointed naval officers in peacetime. Ebsen served as damage control officer and later as executive officer on the Coast Guard-crewed Navy frigate , which recorded weather at its "weather station" 1,500 miles west of Seattle. These patrols consisted of 30 days at sea, followed by 10 days in port at Seattle. Ebsen was honorably discharged from the Coast Guard as a lieutenant in 1946.

Return to acting

Ebsen made his television debut on an episode of The Chevrolet Tele-Theatre in 1949. This led to television appearances in: Stars Over Hollywood, Gruen Guild Playhouse, four episodes of Broadway Television Theatre, Schlitz Playhouse of Stars, Corky and White Shadow, the H.J. Heinz Company's Studio 57, Screen Directors Playhouse, two episodes of Climax!, Tales of Wells Fargo, Playhouse 90, Westinghouse Desilu Playhouse, Johnny Ringo, two episodes of Bonanza, three episodes of Maverick (in which he portrayed assorted homicidal villains), and 77 Sunset Strip. Ebsen received wide television exposure when he played Georgie Russel, a role based on a historical person  and companion to frontiersman Davy Crockett, in the Disneyland television miniseries Davy Crockett (1954–1955).

In the 1958–1959 season, Ebsen co-starred in the 26-episode half-hour NBC television adventure series Northwest Passage. This series, the first half-hour Western filmed and broadcast in color on NBC, was a fictionalized account of Major Robert Rogers, a colonial American fighter for the British in the French and Indian War. Ebsen played the role of Sergeant Hunk Marriner; Keith Larsen played Rogers. From 1960 to 1962, Ebsen appeared in episodes of the television series Rawhide and Tales of Wells Fargo. Ebsen also portrayed a corrupt, bloodthirsty marshal in "El Paso Stage", an episode of Have Gun, Will Travel broadcast in April 1961.

Between October 1961 and March 1962, Ebsen had a recurring role as Virge Blessing in the ABC drama series Bus Stop, the story of travelers passing through the bus station and diner in the fictitious town of Sunrise, Colorado. Robert Altman directed several episodes. Arthur O'Connell had played Virge Blessing in the earlier film version on which the series was loosely based. Ebsen also appeared as "Mr. Dave" Browne, a homeless hobo, on The Andy Griffith Show opposite Ron Howard, and as Jimbo Cobb in The Twilight Zone episode "The Prime Mover" (season 2, episode 21) in 1961. Throughout the show's run, he played several characters on Gunsmoke including as the episode title character in Season 17, Episode 11 (Drago). A notable exception to Ebsen's continual work in Westerns and rural television shows was an acclaimed role as Doc Golightly, an older, rural veterinarian deserted by his young wife (played by Audrey Hepburn) in 1961's Breakfast at Tiffany's.

The Beverly Hillbillies (1962–1971)

Ebsen became famous as Jed Clampett, an easygoing backwoods mountaineer who strikes oil and moves with his family to Beverly Hills, California, in the long-running, fish-out-of-water CBS sitcom The Beverly Hillbillies.

Although scorned by critics, The Beverly Hillbillies attracted as many as 60 million viewers between 1962 and 1971 and was several times the highest-rated series on television. The show also spawned similar Paul Henning-produced rural sitcoms such as Green Acres and Petticoat Junction, which were eventually linked in crossover episode arcs. The Beverly Hillbillies was still earning good ratings when it was cancelled by CBS (because programmers began shunning shows that attracted a rural audience). One episode, "The Giant Jack Rabbit", was the highest-rated half-hour on television to that time and remains the most-watched half-hour sitcom episode.

Not all was harmonious among cast members on The Beverly Hillbillies set, especially between the politically conservative Ebsen and the more liberal Nancy Kulp. Said Douglas, "They had a different view, so they had some heated discussions about that. They would go at it for weeks." In 1984, Kulp unsuccessfully ran for the U.S. House of Representatives as a Democrat from Pennsylvania. To her dismay, Ebsen supported her Republican opponent, incumbent Representative Bud Shuster, going so far as to tape an ad for Shuster that labeled Kulp as "too liberal". Ebsen claimed she was exploiting her celebrity status and did not know the issues.

Barnaby Jones (1973–1980)
Ebsen returned to television in 1973 as the title character of Barnaby Jones, which proved to be his second long-running television series. Barnaby Jones was a milk-drinking detective who came out of retirement to investigate the death of his son. Critics and CBS executives ridiculed the age of the show's audience, but it lasted 8 seasons and 178 episodes. Lee Meriwether, 1955 Miss America, played Barnaby's widowed daughter-in-law, Betty Jones. Ebsen appeared briefly as Barnaby Jones on two other productions: a 1975 episode of Cannon and the 1993 film The Beverly Hillbillies.

Meriwether said of her on and off screen chemistry with Ebsen, "He really worked at being at the top of his game." "You had to keep up with him. I adored him. I think he had feelings for me, too." She also said  of the man, "I loved that man! I was so lucky. He was a dream." "He loved the idea of being a detective. We had CSI-type equipment in the office on the set and he liked doing his own tests. It was a show the whole family could watch."

Other television credits
Ebsen's last regular television series was Matt Houston on ABC, starring Lee Horsley. Ebsen played Matt's uncle, Roy Houston, during the show's third season from 1984 to 1985. He also appeared in "The Waiting Room",  a Night Gallery segment that originally aired January 26, 1972.

Ebsen narrated the documentary series Disney Family Album during the 1980s on the Disney Channel and Steven Kellogg's "Paul Bunyan" on the PBS series Reading Rainbow in 1985. He made his final guest-starring appearance in 1994 on an episode of the short-lived television series revival Burke's Law.

Later years
Although generally retired from acting as he entered his 80s, Ebsen filmed a cameo in the 1993 film version of The Beverly Hillbillies as Barnaby Jones. This was Ebsen's final motion picture role. In 1999, Ebsen provided the voice of Chet Elderson for an episode of the Fox Entertainment program King of the Hill. This was his last TV appearance.

Ebsen has a star on the Hollywood Walk of Fame at 1765 Vine Street, and a star on the St. Louis Walk of Fame.

In 1993, Ebsen was inducted as a Disney Legends award winner.

Personal life

In 1936, Ebsen married Ruth Cambridge. They had two daughters. The marriage ended in divorce.

In 1945, Ebsen married fellow lieutenant Nancy Wolcott. They had four daughters, including Kiki Ebsen, and a son. This marriage, after 39 years, also ended in divorce. His daughters Kiki, Kathy, and Bonnie are all accomplished horsewomen.

In 1985, Ebsen married his third wife, Dorothy "Dotti" Knott. They had no children.

Throughout his life, Ebsen had many interests. He became a folk artist and an avid coin collector, co-founding the Beverly Hills Coin Club in 1987 with actor Chris Aable. Ebsen's collection included many rarities such as a four-dollar gold piece worth $200,000. The coin was sold in several auctions both before and after his death. As Ebsen entered his nineties, he continued to keep active, and two years before his death, his bestselling novel Kelly's Quest was published. Ebsen wrote several other books including Polynesian Concept (about sailing), The Other Side of Oz (an autobiography) and Sizzling Cold Case (a mystery based on his Barnaby Jones character).

Ebsen supported Barry Goldwater in the 1964 United States presidential election.

Death
Ebsen died of respiratory failure at Torrance Memorial Medical Center in Torrance, California, on July 6, 2003, at the age of 95. Upon his death, his burial was at Pacific Crest Cemetery in Redondo Beach, California.

Discography

Albums
 The Beverly Hillbillies (1993) - with Irene Ryan
 Buddy's Originals (2001)
 Buddy Ebsen Says Howdy (2003)

Filmography

Film
Excluding appearances as himself.

 Broadway Melody of 1936 (1935) as Ted Burke
 Captain January (1936) as Paul Roberts
 Born to Dance (1936) as 'Mush' Tracy
 Banjo on My Knee (1936) as Buddy
 Broadway Melody of 1938 (1937) as Peter Trot
 The Girl of the Golden West (1938) as 'Alabama'
 Yellow Jack (1938) as 'Jellybeans'
 My Lucky Star (1938) as Buddy
 Four Girls in White (1939) as Express
 The Kid from Texas (1939) as 'Snifty'
 The Wizard of Oz (1939, replaced before filming due to health reasons) as The Tin Man (singing voice, uncredited)
 They Met in Argentina (1941) as Duke Ferrel
 Parachute Battalion (1941) as Jeff Hollis
 Sing Your Worries Away (1942) as Tommy Jones
 Under Mexicali Stars (1950) as Homer Oglethorpe
 Silver City Bonanza (1951) as Gabe Horne
 Thunder in God's Country (1951) as Deputy Happy Hooper
 Rodeo King and the Senorita (1951) as Muscles Benton
 Utah Wagon Train (1951) as Snooper
 The Andrews Sisters (1951, TV Movie) as Tex
 Red Garters (1954) as Ginger Pete
 Night People (1954) as MSgt. Eddie McColloch
 Davy Crockett, King of the Wild Frontier (1955) as George Russel (archive footage)
 Davy Crockett and the River Pirates (1956) as George Russel (archive footage)
 Attack (1956) as Sfc. Tolliver - Fox Co.
 Between Heaven and Hell (1956) as Pvt. Willie Crawford
 Mission of Danger (1959, based on three Northwest Passage TV episodes) as Hunk Marriner (archive footage)
 Frontier Rangers (1959) as Sergeant Hunk Marriner (archive footage)
 Breakfast at Tiffany's (1961) as Doc Golightly
 Westinghouse Presents: That's Where the Town Is Going (1962, TV Movie) as George Prebble
 The Interns (1962) as Dr. Sidney Wohl
 Mail Order Bride (1964) as Will Lane
 Mr. Kingston (1964, TV Movie)
 The One and Only, Genuine, Original Family Band (1968) as Calvin Bower
 The Andersonville Trial (1970, TV Movie) as Dr. John Bates
 Gunsmoke (1971, S17E11 "Drago") as Drago
 The Daughters of Joshua Cabe (1972, TV Movie) as Joshua Cabe
 The Horror at 37,000 Feet (1973, TV Movie) as Glenn Farlee
 Tom Sawyer (1973, TV Movie) as Muff Potter
 The President's Plane is Missing (1973, TV Movie) as Vice President Kermit Madigan
 Smash-Up on Interstate 5 (1976, TV Movie) as Al Pearson
 Leave Yesterday Behind (1978, TV Movie) as Doc
 The Bastard (1978, TV Movie) as Benjamin Edes
 The Critical List (1978, TV Movie) as Charles Sprague
 The Paradise Connection (1979, TV Movie) as Stuart Douglas
 Return of the Beverly Hillbillies (1981, TV Movie) as Jed Clampett
 Fire on the Mountain (1981, TV Movie) as John Vogelin
 Stone Fox (1987, TV Movie) as Grandpa
 Working Tra$h (1990, TV Movie) as Vandevere Lodge
 The Beverly Hillbillies (1993) as Barnaby Jones (cameo)

Television
 Northwest Passage (1958–1959) as Sergeant Hunk Marriner in 26 episodes
 Bonanza (1959) as Sheriff Jesse Sanders in the episode "The Sisters"
 Maverick (1959) as Sheriff Scratch Mannon in the episode "The Cats of Paradise"
 Riverboat (1960), as Niles Cox in "The Water of Gorgeous Springs"
 The Twilight Zone (1961) as Jimbo Cobb in "The Prime Mover"
 The Barbara Stanwyck Show (1961) as Dr. Mark Carroll in "Little Big Mouth"
 The Andy Griffith Show (1961) as David Browne in "Opie's Hobo Friend"
 Gunsmoke (1961) as Print Quimby in the episode “All That”
 Rawhide (1962) as Doctor George Stimson in "The Pitchwagon"
 The Beverly Hillbillies (1962–1971) as  Jed Clampett in 274 episodes
 Gunsmoke (1971) as Drago in the episode "Drago"
 Bonanza (1972) as Cactus Murphy in "The Saddle Stiff"
 Alias Smith and Jones (1972) as Phil Archer in "High Lonesome Country" 
 Barnaby Jones (1973–1980) as Barnaby Jones in 178 episodes
 Cannon (1975) as Barnaby Jones in "The Deadly Conspiracy: Part 1"
 Matt Houston (1984–1985) as Roy Houston in 22 episodes
 Burke's Law (1994) as Louie Pike in "Who Killed Nick Hazard?"
 King of the Hill (1999) as Chet Elderson (voice) in "A Firefighting We Will Go"

Books (as author)
 Polynesian Concept, with George A. Gunston (1972)
 The Other Side of Oz, with Stephen Cox (1994)
 Kelly's Quest (2000)
 Sizzling Cold Case, with Darlene Quinn

References

Further reading
 Frank, Rusty E. Tap: The Greatest Tap Dance Stars and Their Stories, 1900–1955. New York: W. Morrow, 1990. 
 Wise, James. Stars in Blue: Movie Actors in America's Sea Services. Annapolis, MD: Naval Institute Press, 1997.

External links
 Buddy Ebsen Papers at the University of Wyoming - American Heritage Center
 
 
 
 
 The official Buddy Ebsen Virtual Museum
 The official Buddy Ebsen web site
 Fan tribute site
 AP obituary at Legacy.com

1908 births
2003 deaths
Illinois Republicans
Male actors from Illinois
20th-century American male actors
American male film actors
American male stage actors
American male dancers
American tap dancers
American male television actors
United States Coast Guard personnel of World War II
California Republicans
American numismatists
American people of Baltic German descent
American people of Danish descent
Infectious disease deaths in California
People from Belleville, Illinois
Male actors from Orlando, Florida
Military personnel from Illinois
Rollins College alumni
United States Coast Guard officers
University of Florida alumni
Vaudeville performers
Metro-Goldwyn-Mayer contract players
Singers from Orlando, Florida
Deaths from respiratory failure
20th-century American singers
Eccentric dancers
Western (genre) television actors
20th-century American dancers
20th-century American male singers